The European Banking Authority (EBA) is a regulatory agency of the European Union headquartered in Paris. Its activities include conducting stress tests on European banks to increase transparency in the European financial system and identifying weaknesses in banks' capital structures.

The EBA has the power to overrule national regulators if they fail to properly regulate their banks. The EBA is able to prevent regulatory arbitrage and should allow banks to compete fairly throughout the EU. The EBA will prevent a race to the bottom because banks established in jurisdictions with less regulation will no longer be at a competitive advantage compared to banks based in jurisdictions with more regulations as all banks will henceforth have to comply with the higher pan European standard.

History

The EBA was established on 1 January 2011, upon which date it inherited all of the tasks and responsibilities of the Committee of European Banking Supervisors (CEBS). In continuity with the CEBS secretariat and until 30th March 2019 it was located in London.

As a consequence of the United Kingdom's planned withdrawal from the EU, the European Commission worked on plans to move the EBA (alongside the European Medicines Agency) out of the United Kingdom, to keep it inside the remaining EU member states. Future homes considered for the agency were Brussels, Dublin, Frankfurt, Luxembourg, Paris, Prague, Vienna and Warsaw. In the end, Paris was selected by drawing of lots to house the EBA, at 18:40 CET on Monday, 20 November 2017.

In June 2021, the EBA said that banks in the European Union must have a ten-year plan that explains how they will deal with environmental, social, and government (ESG) risks to their bottom line.

Mission and tasks

The main task of the EBA is to contribute, through the adoption of binding Technical Standards (BTS) and Guidelines, to the creation of the European Single Rulebook in banking. The Single Rulebook aims at providing a single set of harmonised prudential rules for financial institutions throughout the EU, helping create a level playing field and providing high protection to depositors, investors and consumers.

The Authority also plays an important role in promoting convergence of supervisory practices to ensure a harmonised application of prudential rules. Finally, the EBA is mandated to assess risks and vulnerabilities in the EU banking sector through, in particular, regular risk assessment reports and pan-European stress tests.

Other tasks set out in the EBA's mandate include:

 investigating alleged incorrect or insufficient application of EU law by national authorities 
 taking decisions directed at individual competent authorities or financial institutions in emergency situations 
 mediating to resolve disagreements between competent authorities in cross-border situations 
 acting as an independent advisory body to the European Parliament, the Council or the Commission. 
 taking a leading role in promoting transparency, simplicity and fairness in the market for consumer financial products or services across the internal market.

To perform these tasks, the EBA can produce a number of regulatory and non regulatory documents including binding Technical Standards, Guidelines, Recommendations, Opinions, Questions and Answers (Q&As) and ad-hoc or regular reports. The Binding Technical Standards are legal acts which specify particular aspects of an EU legislative text (Directive or Regulation) and aim at ensuring consistent harmonisation in specific areas. The EBA develops draft BTS which are finally endorsed and adopted by the European Commission. Contrary to other documents such as Guidelines or Recommendations, the BTS are legally binding and directly applicable in all Member States.

Common Reporting Framework
Common Reporting (COREP) is the standardised reporting framework issued by the EBA for the Capital Requirements Directive reporting. It covers credit risk, market risk, operational risk, own fund and capital adequacy ratios. This reporting framework has been adopted by almost 30 European countries. Regulated institutions are periodically required to file COREP reports, on both a solo and consolidated basis using XBRL in Eurofiling architecture taxonomies.  All regulated organisations in the UK must use COREP to make their regular statutory reports from 1 January 2014 onwards.

Leadership

Chair: 
 José Manuel Campa (since 1 May 2019)
 Andrea Enria (1 January 2011 - 31 December 2018)

Executive Director: 
 François-Louis Michaud (since 1 September 2020)
 Peter Mihalik (acting, 2020)
  (2011-2020)

See also

European Central Bank (Single Supervisory Mechanism)
European Insurance and Occupational Pensions Authority
European Medicines Agency
European Securities and Markets Authority
European System of Financial Supervision
European Systemic Risk Board
List of acronyms: European sovereign-debt crisis

References

External links
 
 Regulation (EU) No 1093/2010
 Larosière report
 EuroFiling initiative: XBRL taxonomies for COREP and FINREP regulatory frameworks

2011 in the European Union
Agencies of the European Union
Banking in the European Union
La Défense
European Union financial market policy
Financial regulatory authorities
Government agencies established in 2011
International organizations based in France